Medical cannibalism is the consumption or use of the human body, dead or alive, to treat diseases. The medical trade and pharmacological use of human body parts and fluids arose from the belief that because the human body is able to heal itself, it can also help heal another human body. This belief was shared among different groups, including ancient Mesopotamian, Egyptian, Greek, Chinese and Judaic cultures. Much of medical cannibalism applied the principles of sympathetic magic, for example that powdered blood helps bleeding, human fat helps bruising, and powdered skulls help with migraines or dizziness.

History

Egypt 
Medical cannibalism may have begun in ancient Egypt with the exploitation of mummies. There are no primary sources for the practice of medical cannibalism in Ancient Egypt.

Europe 
Medical cannibalism in Europe can be traced back to the Roman Empire in the second century AD. According to fifteenth century philosopher Marsilio Ficino, Romans drank the blood of slain gladiators to absorb the vitality of strong young men and suggested adopting the practice by drinking blood from the arm of young persons. Medical cannibalism in Europe reached its peak in the sixteenth century, with the practice becoming widespread in Germany, France, Italy, and England.

Most "raw materials" for the practice came from mummies that were stolen from Egyptian tombs, skulls that were taken from Irish burial sites, gravediggers who robbed and sold body parts. Medicines were created from human bones, blood, and fat and believed to treat many types of illnesses. Tinctures were made to treat internal bleeding by soaking mummified bodies in alcohol or vinegar. Powdered skull was used to treat ailments of the head, and was even sometimes mixed with chocolate to treat apoplexy. In the 1800s, Englishmen treated epilepsy by mixing skull with molasses. In addition, human fat was used to treat problems of the outer body either by rubbing it directly on the skin or soaking the bandage in fat first then applying it on the wound.

As this practice became more and more common, the adaption of "like cures like" was used to determine the treatment for various ailments. For example, parts of the head was used to treat issues relating to the head and eyes of dead people were collected and used to treat Ophthalmological issues.

Blood, specifically, soon evolved to be seen as a substantial elixir, especially fresh, warm human blood because it was believed to still possess the soul of the deceased. For example, it was believed that drinking the blood of a strong person or a wise person would result in increase of strength or wisdom, respectively, because once ingested, the spirit of the deceased connects with that of the consumer and lends it its power. This belief was especially common in Germany, as well as in Rome, where gladiator's blood was drunk to gain their strength. Even the poor, who could not afford other remedies, took part in this practice by taking their own cups to executions, paying the executioner a small fee, then filling their cups with the fresh blood. The execution of criminals was seen as "killing two birds with one stone," it reduced the criminal burden and served the public good.

Europeans also adopted the what they thought was the Ancient Egyptian belief that the more valuable corpses were those of a fresh, young body, especially those that died a brutal sudden death, for it was believed that the spirit of the body would remain trapped in there for a longer period of time, and thus would have greater healing powers.

Concoctions 
Although the blood was normally drunk warm and fresh for increased effectiveness, some people preferred to have it cooked. Therefore a recipe of how to turn blood into marmalade was invented. In 1679, a Franciscan apothecary suggested letting the blood partially dry and chopping into small pieces to allow remaining water to seep out. Then, cooking the blood into a batter, before sifting it into a jar.

In the seventeenth and eighteenth century, "man’s grease" became in high demand. Executioners would sell the fat of the people they executed, which would then be melted and filled into vessels. Apothecaries sold it as a remedy for pain, inflammation, rabies, joint problems, and scars. Additionally, the skin of the executed was also used for medical purposes. Pregnant women placed that skin around their belly during childbirth because it was thought to reduce birth pains. Others placed it around their neck to prevent thyroid problems.

Mummia, a medicine that started out in Egypt and quickly became in high demand throughout Europe within the sixteenth century, was thought to cure any ailment there was. The black remnants in the skull and abdominal cavities were scraped out of mummies and placed in a large vase. Apothecaries mixed this mummia with herbs and wine, then prescribed it as medicine for their patients.

In Germany, around the early 1600s, a recipe for wine from flesh was invented. According to this recipe, the body of a human, specifically a young, flawless, red-head was used. Their flesh was chopped up and mixed with aloe and myrrh, then mashed and cured into a "wine."

Modern medical cannibalism 
Medical cannibalism is not simply the eating, drinking and use of human body parts and fluids, but also the exploitation of the human body for medical purposes, especially without the prior consent of the person. This practice was seen, for example, in the early twentieth century, when Germans were sold mummies in medical catalogs.

Although most people do not engage in drinking of blood or usage of essential oils derived from mummies, one way that medical cannibalism continues today is in the form of organ transplants. Organ trafficking became widespread because of high demand and short supply. Organ trade or trafficking involves the purchase and sale of transplant organs from live donors. Although this practice is prohibited in most countries, it still occurs frequently. In fact, it is estimated the approximately 10,000 transplanted organs are obtained through some form of organ trafficking annually.

One extreme case of this occurred in 2001 and 2002 when more than 100 kidney transplants were done at St. Augustine Hospital in South Africa illegally. Another occurred in 2005, when kidneys of Chinese prisoners were sold to British patients. Yet another example is the large scale organ trafficking system that was uncovered in India in 2002, that was valued at about $32.4 million. This system involved about 1,972 cases of illegal organ transplants, of mostly poor and migrant workers who did not receive proper care and were threatened with imprisonment if they did not comply.

References 

Cannibalism